It is a national professional body working in the public interest, FP Canada (formerly known as Financial Planning Standards Council) certifies professional financial planners.

See also
Partners in the Profession
Donald J. Johnston Lifetime Achievement Award in Financial Planning
FP Canada Fellow Distinction
President’s List
History
Find a Certified Financial Planner

References

 FP Canada
 IQPF

Professional associations based in Canada
Organizations based in Toronto